Olga Zolina (born 6 February 1975) is a climate scientist, member of the European Geosciences Union, German  Meteorological Society and the American Geophysical Union. As of 2020, she was working at the Shirshov Institute of Oceanology in Moscow, and at CNRS Institut des Géosciences de l’Environnement, Grenoble.

Areas of expertise
 Climate change in global- and continental-scale water cycle 
 Extreme climate events, statistical modelling of extreme precipitation 
 Dynamics of midlatitude and polar cyclones in the present and future climate 
 Air-sea interaction at synoptic and climate time scales

Publications
 "Changes in Intense Precipitation in Europe" in Changes in Flood Risk in Europe (2012), ed. Zbigniew W. Kundzewicz

References

Women climatologists
Living people
1975 births
Russian meteorologists
Scientists from Moscow